Carregosa is a civil parish in the municipality of Oliveira de Azeméis, Portugal. The population in 2011 was 3,419, in an area of 11.82 km2.

References

Freguesias of Oliveira de Azeméis